Giovanni Marcolini, O.F.M. (died 1465) was a Roman Catholic prelate who served as Bishop of Nocera de' Pagani (1444–1465).

Biography
Giovanni Marcolini was appointed a priest in the Order of Friars Minor.
On 6 November 1444, he was appointed during the papacy of Pope Paul II as Bishop of Nocera de' Pagani.
He served as Bishop of Nocera de' Pagani until his death in 1465.

While bishop, he was the principal co-consecrator of Francesco Oddi de Tuderto, Bishop of Assisi (1445).

References

External links and additional sources
 (for Chronology of Bishops) 
 (for Chronology of Bishops) 

15th-century Italian Roman Catholic bishops
Bishops appointed by Pope Paul II
1465 deaths
Franciscan bishops